Cornelis "Cor" Groot (21 January 1909, Akersloot – 23 September 1978, Haarlem) was a sailor from the Netherlands, who represented his country at the 1968 Summer Olympics in Acapulco. Groot, as helmsman on the Dutch Dragon, took 10th place with crew members Jan Bol and Pieter de Zwart. Groot was also the substitute helmsmen for the 1964 Dutch Dragon.

Sources

External links
 
 
 

1909 births
1978 deaths
People from Akersloot
Dutch male sailors (sport)
Olympic sailors of the Netherlands
Sailors at the 1968 Summer Olympics – Dragon
Sportspeople from North Holland